Sidek bin Saniff (born 18 April 1938) is a former Singaporean politician and activist. A member of the ruling People's Action Party, he was the Member of Parliament of Aljunied GRC for Eunos ward from 1997 to 2001.

He was Parliamentary Ministry of Communications and Information and Second Parliamentary Secretary, Ministry of Culture from 1980 to 1981, Parliamentary Secretary, Ministry of Social Affairs from 1981 to 1984 and Parliamentary Secretary, Ministry of Trade and Industry from 1981 to 1988. 

He also served as Senior Parliamentary Secretary, Ministry of Education from 1988 to 1991, Minister of State for Ministry of Education from 1991 to 1995, Senior Minister of State, Ministry of Education from 1996 to 1997 and Senior Minister of State, Ministry of the Environment from 1997 to 2001.

Sidek was involved in politics for 25 years before retiring in 2001. He was instrumental in the formation of MENDAKI, a self-help group for the Malay community in Singapore.

Sidek is married to Sharifa Binti Mirza Abdul Majid. His wife's youngest brother was Corporal Mirza Abdul Halim bin Mirza Abdul Majid, a police officer who was killed while pursuing a suspected burglar Ong Yeow Tian, who was subsequently sentenced to hang for his murder.

Early life 
Sidek was the second child of 13 children. He became a Malay language teacher and an activist for the increased recognition of the Malay language in schools in Singapore. As an activist, Sidek organised a demonstration outside the Ministry of Education for better salaries for Malay language teachers in the 1960s.

Sidek was a teacher at now-defunct Maju Secondary School between 1968 and 1976. He was also the President of the Singapore Malay Teachers' Union between 1970 and 1976.

Political career 
In 1976, then Prime Minister Lee Kuan Yew invited Sidek to join the People's Action Party and contest as a candidate in the upcoming elections. Sidek stood for election in Kolam Ayer SMC and won against United Front's Chetty Rajah with 72.5% of the votes against Chetty's 27.5%. In the 1980 General Election, Sidek stood for election against another United Front candidate, Mohamed Monsor Rahman, and won 80.35% of the votes. In the 1984 General Election, Sidek faced Royston George Scharenguivel from the Workers' Party. Sidek won 57.91% of the votes, a significant drop from his previous two election results.

In 1988, the GRC system was established, resulting in Kolam Ayer SMC being part of 3-person Jalan Besar GRC. Sidek's team won 62.68% of the vote against candidates from the Workers' Party. In 1991, Sidek joined the PAP team for Eunos GRC, switching places with Zulkifli bin Mohammed. The PAP team narrowly won the election with 52.38% of the votes cast against the WP team led by Lee Siew-Choh. Lee's team had narrowly lost in the same GRC during the previous election in 1988. Following the redrawing of boundaries for the 1997 General Election, Sidek was part of the PAP team contesting Aljunied GRC. The PAP team included future Foreign Minister George Yeo and Ker Sin Tze. The team won 67.02% of the votes against the SDP team.

Sidek was the Parliamentary Secretary for Communications and Second Parliamentary Secretary for Culture for a short period before the 1980 elections. He became Parliamentary Secretary for Trade and Industry and Social Affairs in the fifth Lee Kuan Yew cabinet.

Sidek eventually rose to become the Senior Minister of State for Education and the Environment under then Prime Minister Goh Chok Tong. He retired from politics in 2001.

References 

People's Action Party politicians
Living people
1938 births
Members of the Parliament of Singapore
Singaporean people of Malay descent
Singaporean Muslims